The Connecticut Huskies baseball teams represented the University of Connecticut in Storrs, Connecticut, United States in college baseball at the NCAA Division I level.

2000

Personnel

Roster

Coaches

Schedule

2001

Personnel

Roster

Coaches

Schedule

2002

Personnel

Roster

Coaches

Schedule

2003

Personnel

Roster

Coaches

Schedule

2004

Personnel

Roster

Coaches

Schedule

2005

Personnel

Roster

Coaches

Schedule

2006

Personnel

Roster

Coaches

Schedule

2007

Personnel

Roster

Coaches

Schedule

2008

Personnel

Roster

Coaches

Schedule

2009

Personnel

Roster

Coaches

Schedule

References

UConn Huskies baseball seasons